Frédéric Besseyre (born 2 May 1979) is a French footballer who plays for FC Stade Nyonnais in the Swiss Challenge League.

References

External links

1979 births
Living people
French footballers
French expatriate footballers
Swiss Challenge League players
FC Stade Nyonnais players
Servette FC players
Étoile Carouge FC players
CS Chênois players
Expatriate footballers in Switzerland
Association football forwards